The Transbaikal zokor (Myospalax psilurus) is a species of rodent in the family Spalacidae. It is found in China, Mongolia, and Russia.

References
 Shar, S., Tsytsulina, K. & Lkhagvasuren, D. 2008.  Myospalax psilurus.   2008 IUCN Red List of Threatened Species.   Downloaded on 16 August 2009.

Myospalax
Mammals described in 1874
Taxonomy articles created by Polbot
Taxa named by Henri Milne-Edwards
Rodents of China
Mammals of Mongolia
Mammals of Siberia
Rodents of Asia